"(Last Night) I Heard You Crying in Your Sleep" is a song written and recorded by Hank Williams on MGM Records.  It was released as the B-side of "Move It on Over" in 1947.

Background
Hank Williams recorded "(Last Night) I Heard You Crying in Your Sleep" at his first MGM recording session after releasing a few sides with Sterling Records.  Despite its bouncy tempo, the song contains somber lyrics about a heartbroken man who has come to realize that the woman he loves has never loved him.  Making the song even sadder is the forgiving tone of the narrator ("I know you tried your best to love me," "I love you so much I want you happy"), and its simple language is as good an illustration as any of the profound simplicity of Williams' love songs.  An embryonic version of the song exists as a lyric sheet in the Alabama Department of Archives and History with words quite dissimilar to the finished recording, suggesting that songwriting wasn't quite the spontaneous act that Williams later made it out to be in interviews; in 1952 he declared to Pathfinder, "People don't write music. It's given to you; you sit there and wait and it comes to you.  If a song takes longer than thirty minutes or an hour, I usually throw it away.

Williams recorded the song on April 21, 1947 at Castle Studio in Nashville with Fred Rose producing the session.  Williams recorded the song during his first session with MGM on April 21, 1947. The band was composed by part of Red Foley's backing, including Zeke and Zeb Turner (guitar), Brownie Raynolds (bass), Tommy Jackson (fiddle) and Smokey Lohman (steel guitar).

Cover versions
George Jones recorded the song for United Artists in 1962.
 The song appears on Cal Smith's 1968 LP At Home with Cal Smith.
Roy Orbison cut the song for his 1970 Williams tribute Hank Williams the Roy Orbison Way.

References

Sources
 
 

1947 songs
Hank Williams songs
Songs written by Hank Williams
Song recordings produced by Fred Rose (songwriter)